Edward Wise (13 August 1818 – 28 September 1865) was a judge of the Supreme Court of New South Wales.

Wise was born in England, educated at Rugby School, and called to the bar in 1844. He went to Sydney, Australia in 1855 and soon afterward entered politics, being appointed as a member of the Legislative Council. He became Solicitor General in the Parker ministry in May 1857, and Attorney-General of New South Wales under Forster in October 1859. He resigned in 1860 and was appointed a judge of the Supreme Court of New South Wales, but his health gave way and he died while on a visit to Melbourne, on 28 September 1865.

He was the author of treatises on The Law Relating to Riots and Unlawful Assemblies (1848), The Bankrupt Law Consolidation Act (1849), The Common Law Procedure Act (1853), and various legal works in conjunction with other writers.

He married Maria Bate, daughter of Lieutenant John Smith, R.N.. Their second son, Bernhard Wise, was born in Sydney on 10 February 1858. Wise's sister, Emily Anne, married William Montagu Manning.

References

1818 births
1865 deaths
Judges of the Supreme Court of New South Wales
Attorneys General of the Colony of New South Wales
Solicitors General for New South Wales
English emigrants to colonial Australia
Members of the New South Wales Legislative Council
Colony of New South Wales judges
19th-century Australian politicians
19th-century Australian judges